The 1956 UCLA Bruins football team was an American football team that represented the University of California, Los Angeles during the 1956 NCAA University Division football season.  In their eighth year under head coach Red Sanders, the Bruins compiled a 7–3 record (5–2 conference) and finished in third place in the Pacific Coast Conference.

UCLA's offensive leaders in 1956 were quarterback Doug Bradley with 293 passing yards each, Barry Billington with 399 rushing yards, and Dick Wallen with 308 receiving yards.

Schedule

Personnel

Players
 Bob Bergdahl
 Barry Billington, fullback
 Don Birren
 Doug Bradley, halfback
 Dick Butler, center
 Jim Dawson, tackle
 Preston Dills, senior
 Dennis Dressel, center, sophomore
 Don Duncan, halfback, sophomore
 Bob Dutcher
 Lou Elias, wingback
 Bob Enger, quarterback, junior
 Steve Gertsman, quarterback
 Edison Griffin, safety/halfback junior
 Joe Harper, guard
 Esker Harris, guard
 Chuck Holloway, halfback
 Bill Leeka, sophomore
 Don Long
 Jim Matheny, junior
 Pete O'Garro, end
 Phil Parslow, halfback
 Jerry Penner, tackle
 Dan Peterson
 Dave Peterson, fullback
 Pat Pinkston, end
 Don Shinnick
 Hal Smith, junior
 Dick Wallen, end
 Clint Whitfield, guard, sophomore
 Kirk Wilson, punter
 Gary Yurosek, tackle

Coaching staff
 Head coach - Red Sanders
 Assistant coaches - Bill Barns, Deke Brackett, Ray Nagle, George Dickerson, Jim Myers, Johnny Johnson

Other personnel
 Managers - Ted Manos, Frances Helstein, Jim Walker, Ted Dallas, and Barry Snooke
 Head trainer - Ducky Drake

References

UCLA
UCLA Bruins football seasons
UCLA Bruins football
UCLA Bruins football